Terranova dei Passerini is a comune (municipality) in the Province of Lodi in the Italian region Lombardy, located about  southeast of Milan and about  southeast of Lodi.

Terranova dei Passerini borders the following municipalities: Turano Lodigiano, Bertonico, Castiglione d'Adda, Casalpusterlengo, Castelgerundo, Codogno.

References

External links
 Official website

Cities and towns in Lombardy